The tawny-collared nightjar (Antrostomus salvini) is a species of nightjar in the family Caprimulgidae. It is endemic to Mexico.

Taxonomy and systematics

The tawny-collared nightjar was originally described as Caprimulgus salvini; Antrostomus was later split as a separate genus. It and the Yucatan nightjar (A. badius) were for a time considered subspecies of the silky-tailed nightjar (A. sericocaudatus). The tawny-collared nightjar is monotypic.

Description

The male's upperparts are blackish brown; the crown has blackish spots and the back and rump have fine light brown speckles and broad blackish streaks. It has a broad tawny or buff collar on the nape and the sides of the neck that give the species its name. The tail is also dark brown and the three outermost pairs of feathers have wide white tips. The wings are brown to blackish brown with tawny spots and bars. The face is dark reddish with brown barring. The chin and throat are blackish brown with a narrow white band below the latter, the breast blackish brown with cinnamon speckles, and the belly and flanks blackish brown with many white spots. The female is similar but the tips of the tail feathers have a narrow buff band instead of the wide white one, the tawny markings on the wing are paler, and the band on the lower throat is buffy rather than white.

Distribution and habitat

The tawn-collared nightjar is found in northeastern Mexico, from Nuevo León and Tamaulipas south to Veracruz. It is mostly resident but a few apparently move further south in the nonbreeding season. It inhabits arid to semihumid landscapes including brushy woodland, thorn forest, and dense scrublands. It shuns humid and heavily forested areas.

Behavior

Feeding

The tawny-collared nightjar is nocturnal. It hunts for flying insects by sallying from a perch and possibly also from the ground.

Breeding

The tawny-collared nightjar's breeding season spans from April to August. The clutch size is two eggs, probably laid directly on the ground with no nest as is common among nightjars.

Vocalization

The tawny-collared nightjar's song is "an abrupt, clipped chi-wihw or tchi-wheeu, repeated rapidly". It is sung from a hidden perch in a bush or tree, mostly at dawn and dusk, and mostly from March through July.

Status

The IUCN has assessed the tawny-collared nightjar as being of Least Concern. Its population is estimated to be at least 50,000 mature individuals but is decreasing. No immediate threats have been identified.

References

tawny-collared nightjar
Birds of Mexico
tawny-collared nightjar
Taxonomy articles created by Polbot